A City Decides is a 1956 American short documentary film directed by Charles Guggenheim about the racial integration of St. Louis Public Schools.  It was nominated for an Academy Award for Best Documentary Short.

See also
 Civil rights movement in popular culture

References

External links
A City Decides at the National Film Preservation Foundation

1956 films
1956 documentary films
1956 short films
1950s short documentary films
American short documentary films
Documentary films about education in the United States
Documentary films about the civil rights movement
Films directed by Charles Guggenheim
Films set in St. Louis
Films shot in St. Louis
African-American history of Missouri
Education in St. Louis
Documentary films about Missouri
1950s English-language films
1950s American films
American black-and-white films